Groebli is a surname of Swiss origin. Notable people with the surname include:

René Groebli (born 1927), Swiss photographer
 Werner "Frick" Groebli, half of the figure-skating duo Frick and Frack

Surnames of Swiss origin